WWAB (1330 AM) is a radio station broadcasting a variety format. Licensed to Lakeland, Florida, United States, the station is owned by Walco Enterprises, LLC.

History

The Hughes years (1973-2013)

Syndication
WWAB was the originating station of “Straight Talk” and “Conceived in Liberty”, both hosted by Jerry Hughes. The shows were distributed nationally via the Accent Radio Network. Hughes died aged 62 on June 1, 2012.

References

External links
historical information at RadioYears.com

WAB
Radio stations established in 1957
Lakeland, Florida
1957 establishments in Florida